Bar Giora is a moshav in the Judean Mountains in Israel. Located between Beit Shemesh and Jerusalem, it falls under the jurisdiction of Mateh Yehuda Regional Council.

History
The village was initially founded by the Herut movement on 18 October 1950 by immigrants from Yemen, and was first named Allar-Bet, later to be called Ramat Shimon.  It was established on land belonging to the Palestinian village of Allar, which became depopulated  during the 1948 Arab–Israeli War. It is situated northeast of the Allar village site.

The village was also called Eitanim, until residents eventually settled on the name Bar-Giora, after Simon Bar Giora. The Yemenite immigrants, dissatisfied with conditions in their new village, abandoned the village after a short stint of 2-3 years, and in 1954 the village was resettled by immigrants from Morocco.

Attractions
The village is home to the Sea Horse and Bar Giora wineries.

References

External links

Sea Horse Wines, Bar Giora

Moshavim
Populated places established in 1950
Populated places in Jerusalem District
Yemeni-Jewish culture in Israel
1950 establishments in Israel